The stump-tailed macaque (Macaca arctoides), also called the bear macaque, is a species of macaque native to South Asia and Southeast Asia. In India, it occurs south of the Brahmaputra River, in the northeastern part of the country. Its range in India extends from Assam and Meghalaya to eastern Arunachal Pradesh, Nagaland, Manipur, Mizoram and Tripura.

It is primarily frugivorous, but eats many types of vegetation, such as seeds, leaves and roots, but also hunts freshwater crabs, frogs, bird eggs and insects.

Characteristics
Infants are born white and darken as they mature. As they age, their bright pink or red faces darken to brown or nearly black and lose most of their hair. Males' canine teeth, which are important for establishing dominance within social groups, are more elongated than those of the females. Like all macaques, this species has cheek pouches to store food for short periods of time.

Distribution and habitat
This Old World monkey travels quadrupedally, usually on the ground, as it is not very agile in trees. It is generally found in evergreen tropical and subtropical moist broadleaf forests, at different elevations depending on the amount of rainfall in the area. It depends on rainforests for food and shelter, and is not found in dry forests except where it ranges in the Himalayan region of India, only spending time in secondary forests if it is bordering old-growth forest tropical forests. It is distributed from northeastern India and southern China into the northwest tip of West Malaysia on the Malay Peninsula. It is also found in Burma, Thailand, Laos, Cambodia and Vietnam. It is possibly extinct in Bangladesh. No global population estimate is available. In Cambodia, a declining population of 230 is reported from Keo Seima Wildlife Sanctuary.

A study population was introduced to Tanaxpillo, an uninhabited island in Lake Catemaco, Veracruz, Mexico in 1974, where it ranges in seminatural conditions. Most information on the species comes from the introduced population on Tanaxpillo and other captive settings, as few long-term studies have been conducted on the stump-tailed macaque in the wild.

Behaviour and ecology 
Stump-tailed macaque generally share the same social structure of any macaque species with a linear dominance hierarchy that is rigid and hereditary in females yet fluctuates among males based on their fighting ability and social manoeuvring, but what makes stump-tail macaques truly unique is their ability to defuse intense confrontations and maintain a high degree of pacifism and harmony in their troop, thanks to their surprisingly rich repertoire of reconciliation tactics. This species has no lasting pair bonds and is truly promiscuous, a staple for macaques. Physical violence very rarely occurs, and although minor scraps often flair up and physical intimidation displays occur, they tend to quickly be resolved, resulting in this species being labelled as peaceful. Stump-tailed macaques are remarkably unfussy in their eating habits though fruit generally is a staple part of their diet. Stump-tail macaques have a large, bulky, muscular build with thick, solid limbs, making them very mobile on land yet quite ungainly in trees, and this unusual physique for a macaque may be responsible for this species unique tendency to consume larger quantities of meat than other macaque species. Stump-tail macaques feed on very large quantities of insects, small animals and eggs.

Reproduction
A study population of female stump-tailed macaques was found to have increased levels of steroid sex hormones, specifically 17β-estradiol and progesterone levels. 17β-estradiol levels were significantly greater during summer and fall and progesterone levels were significantly greater during summer, fall and winter. This explains that stump-tailed macaques have two mating seasons per year: one in summer (July–August) and one in fall (November). This is supported by the distribution of birth frequency in stump-tailed macaques.

See also 

 Britches – an infant stump-tailed macaque used in sight-deprivation experiments, which was stolen from the laboratory by the Animal Liberation Front.
 List of endangered and protected species of China

References

stump-tailed macaque
Primates of Southeast Asia
Mammals of Bangladesh
Mammals of India
Mammals of Thailand
Mammals of Vietnam
Mammals of Laos
Mammals of Cambodia
Mammals of Malaysia
Mammals of China
Mammals of Myanmar
Fauna of Yunnan
stump-tailed macaque
Taxa named by Isidore Geoffroy Saint-Hilaire